John Alan Clowes (born 5 November 1929) was a footballer who played in the Football League for Shrewsbury Town and Stoke City. He made four appearances for Stoke.

Career
Clowes was born in Alton, Staffordshire and started his career with Crewe Alexandra before making the short move to Stoke City in 1950. He made just two appearances for Stoke during the 1950–51 season and scored twice in a 3–2 win over Wolverhampton Wanderers at the end of the season. Despite this, he left and joined Shrewsbury Town and then Wellington Town. He made a return to Stoke in the 1955–56 season where he again made just two appearances before joining another non-league club in the form of Macclesfield Town.

Career statistics

References

External links
 

English footballers
Stoke City F.C. players
Crewe Alexandra F.C. players
Shrewsbury Town F.C. players
Telford United F.C. players
Macclesfield Town F.C. players
English Football League players
1929 births
Living people
Association football forwards